Sir Oliver Howard Beale KBE (10 December 1898 – 17 October 1983) was an Australian politician and diplomat. He was a member of the Liberal Party and served in the House of Representatives from 1946 to 1958, representing the New South Wales seat of Parramatta. He held ministerial office in the Menzies Government as Minister for Information (1949–1950), Transport (1949–1950), Supply (1950–1958), and Defence Production (1956–1958). He retired from parliament to serve as Australian Ambassador to the United States (1958–1964). His son Julian also entered politics.

Early life
Beale was born in Tamworth, New South Wales, and educated at Sydney Boys High School and at the University of Sydney. He became a barrister in 1925 and established his own practice. In 1927 he married Margery Ellen Wood. In 1942 served as a sub-lieutenant on anti-submarine duties with the Royal Australian Naval Reserve.

Politics
Beale was elected as the Liberal Party of Australia member for Parramatta in 1946 and became a member of the House Standing Committee on Public Works in 1947. With the election of the Robert Menzies government he became Minister for Information and Minister for Transport in the Menzies Ministry until 17 March 1950, when he became Minister for Supply, a position he retained until his retirement from parliament in February 1958. He was immediately appointed Ambassador to the United States and held that position until 1964.

Later life
Following his retirement, Beale was Regents' Visiting Professor in the University of California in 1966 and Regents' Visiting Professor at the University of Wisconsin–Madison in 1967 and in 1969. He was president of the Arts Council of Australia from 1965 to 1968. He was survived by his wife and his son, Julian.

Honours
Beale was made a Knight Commander of the Order of the British Empire on 10 June 1961.

British nuclear tests in Australia 
As Minister of Supply, Beale assisted in the facilitation of British nuclear weapons testing in Australia which took place at the Montebello Islands, Emu Field and Maralinga.

Of the proposed Maralinga testing program, he told the media in 1955, "Every precaution will be taken to ensure there is no danger to human beings or stock". This statement later proved to be untrue, with aboriginal people and military servicemen becoming contaminated and fallout from tests being detected as far afield as Adelaide. Fallout from testing at the Montebello Islands in Australia's northwest was detected in Queensland, in Australia's northeast.

A Royal Commission into British nuclear tests in Australia took place, following Beale's death, in 1984–1985.

Nuclear power 
Beale said of nuclear power in 1956 that his Government believed that "completely effective precautions have already been developed to avoid hazards to the population from the use of nuclear power reactors". He endorsed the study of radiation's effect following the Maralinga nuclear weapons tests. Anticipating an expansion in nuclear power generation and other uses of atomic energy, he stated that he believed that it was "necessary that we should expand our knowledge of the problems of radiation as fully and as quickly as possible".

Writings

References

1898 births
1983 deaths
Liberal Party of Australia members of the Parliament of Australia
Members of the Australian House of Representatives
Members of the Australian House of Representatives for Parramatta
Australian Knights Commander of the Order of the British Empire
Australian politicians awarded knighthoods
Members of the Cabinet of Australia
Ambassadors of Australia to the United States
20th-century Australian politicians